Boris Aleksandrovich Pelikan (1861-1931) was the Mayor of Odessa, Ukraine, Russia, from 1913-1917.

See also
List of mayors of Odessa, Ukraine

Notes

1861 births
1931 deaths
Mayors of Odesa